is a passenger railway station located in the city of Mitoyo, Kagawa Prefecture, Japan, operated by Shikoku Railway Company (JR Shikoku). Tsushimanomiya Station is a seasonal station, which opens on August 4 and 5 only, coinciding with the nearby  Great Summer Festival. Among seasonal stations this station has the shortest number of operating days per year in Japan.

Lines

Adjacent stations

History
Tsushimanomiya Station opened on 7 May 1915. With the privatization of Japanese National Railways (JNR) on 1 April 1987, the station came under the control of JR Shikoku.

Surrounding area

See also
 List of railway stations in Japan

References

Railway stations in Kagawa Prefecture
Yosan Line
Stations of Shikoku Railway Company
Railway stations in Japan opened in 1915
Mitoyo, Kagawa